WBD may refer to:
 Warner Bros. Discovery, an American mass media conglomerate
 Wimm Bill Dann, large Russian yogurt and juice maker
 Witches' Broom Disease, caused by the fungus Moniliophthora perniciosa
 WMDT-DT2, a television station (channel 47 digital) licensed to Salisbury, Maryland, United States, using the fictional call sign WBD-TV